James William Dunn (October 16, 1911 – April 9, 1983) was an American football and basketball coach.  He served as the head football coach at Northeastern University from 1937 to 1941, compiling a record of 13–21–2 record. Dunn was also head basketball coach at Northeastern from 1937 to 1942, tallying a mark of 26–58.

Head coaching record

Football

References

External links
 

1911 births
1983 deaths
American football halfbacks
Basketball coaches from Pennsylvania
Brown Bears football coaches
College men's basketball head coaches in the United States
Harvard Crimson football coaches
Lafayette Leopards football coaches
Northeastern Huskies football coaches
Northeastern Huskies men's basketball coaches
McDaniel Green Terror football players
People from Grove City, Pennsylvania